This is a list of the Members of Parliament appointed as Steward of the Manor of Poynings, a notional 'office of profit under the crown' which is used to resign from the House of Commons. The Manor of Poynings reverted to the Crown in 1804, but was leased until 1835. The last steward died in 1854.

See also
List of Stewards of the Chiltern Hundreds
List of Stewards of the Manor of East Hendred
List of Stewards of the Manor of Hempholme
List of Stewards of the Manor of Northstead
List of Stewards of the Manor of Old Shoreham

References

Poynings